Paulinum is a genus of hydrozoans belonging to the order Anthoathecata, family unassigned.

The species of this genus are found in Indian Ocean, Northern America.

Species:

Paulinum lineatum 
Paulinum punctatum

References

Capitata
Hydrozoan genera